Marilyn is a feminine given name.

Origin and meaning
Marilyn is a blend of the English given names Mary and Lynn.
First record of the name 
Marilyn: Marilyn Spencer Foster born 1510 in England. It began to be used increasingly in the 1920s, and it reached its peak of popularity in the 1930s, 1940s and 1950s. 
Variants of the name includes: Maralyn, Marelyn, Marilynn, Marlyn, Marylyn, Marrilyn, Marillyn, Merilyn, Merrelyn and Merrilyn.

Notable people

Marilyn (singer) (born 1962), British entertainer
Marilyn Agliotti (born 1979), Dutch-South African field hockey player
Marilyn Anderson, Australian scientist
 Marilyn Aschner (born 1948), American professional tennis player
Marilyn Bergman (1928-2022), American composer, songwriter and author
Marilyn Borden (1932–2009), American singer and actress
Marilyn Brick, Canadian politician
Marilyn Chambers (1952–2009), American pornographic actress
Marilyn Cole (born 1949), Playboy magazine's January 1972 Playmate of the Month
Marilyn French (1929–2009), American author
Marilyn Gladu (born 1962), Canadian politician
Marilyn Hacker (born 1942), American poet, critic and reviewer
Marilyn Hall (c. 1927-2017), Canadian-born American producer and philanthropist
Marillyn Hewson (born 1953), executive of Lockheed Martin
Marilyn Horne (born 1934), American opera singer
Marilyn Howard (1939–2020), American politician
Marilyn Kidd (born 1964), Australian rower
Marilyn Levine (1935–2005), Canadian ceramics artist
Marilyn Lewis (1931–2020), American politician
Marilyn Maxwell (1921–1972), American actress
Marilyn McCoo (born 1943), American singer and actress
Marilyn Milian (born 1961), judge on the television show The People's Court
Marilyn Miller (1898–1936), Broadway performer
Marilyn Monroe (1926–1962), American actress
Marilyn Quayle (born 1949), American lawyer, author and Second Lady of the United States
Marilyn Ramenofsky (born 1946), American freestyle swimmer
Marilyn Scott (born 1949), American singer
Marilyn Singer (born 1948), American author of children's books
Marilyn Strickland (born 1962), American politician
Marilyn vos Savant (born 1946), American columnist and author
Marilyn Waltz (1931–2006), Playboy magazine's February 1954, April 1954, April 1955 Playmate of the Month
Marilyn Wilson-Rutherford (born 1947), American singer
Marilyn Ziering, American business executive and philanthropist from Los Angeles, California
Marilynn Webb (born 1937), New Zealand artist

Stage name
Brian Hugh Warner, American musician and artist who goes by the stage name "Marilyn Manson"

Merrelyn
A variation of Marylin is Merrelyn, sometimes spelled as Merrilyn. Notable people with the name include:

 Merrelyn Emery, Australian psychologist, co-refiner with Fred Emery of the Search Conference participative planning process
 Merrilyn Gann (born 1963), Canadian actress
 Merrilyn Goos, Australian mathematician
 Merrilyn (Merri) Rose (born 1955), Australian politician

Characters
Marilyn Whirlwind, a character in the Northern Exposure TV series
Marilyn (Mario character), a character in Paper Mario: The Thousand-Year Door
Marilyn Lee, a character from the book Everything I Never Told You

References

English feminine given names
Feminine given names